Pterograptidae is an extinct family of graptolites.

Genera
List of genera from Maletz (2014):

†Didymograptellus Cooper & Fortey, 1982
†Pseudobryograptus Mu, 1957
†Pterograptus Holm, 1881b
†Xiphograptus Cooper & Fortey, 1982
†Yutagraptus Riva, 1994

References

Graptolites
Prehistoric hemichordate families